XHUMI-FM is a radio station serving Torreón, Coahuila owned by the Universidad Millennium Internacional. It is branded as Radio Millennium and broadcasts on 101.9 FM from its campus.

References

External links
Radio Umi 101.9 Facebook

Radio stations in the Comarca Lagunera
Radio stations in Coahuila
Mass media in Torreón
University radio stations in Mexico